The Hetman Petro Sahaidachny National Army Academy is one of the leading educational institutions in the military education system of the Ministry of Defense of Ukraine, founded originally in 1899 as a school of infantry cadets. It is engaged in the training of future officers of the Ukrainian Armed Forces.

History

Austria-Hungary 
On October 1, 1899, on the territory of the present Academy, the opening of the Imperial and Royal School of Cadets in Lviv (K. und k. Infanterie Kadettenschule in Lemberg) was held. This facility was the only one in Galicia and the sixteenth military academy in Austria-Hungary. Graduates of the institution received the title "Kadet - Deputy Officer". In 1914 the school was evacuated to Austria. Among the outstanding graduates were Colonel Hnat Stefaniv, Lieutenant Colonel Alfred Bizantz, and Ataman Boguslav Shashkevich, who played an important role during the Ukrainian War of Independence.

Second Polish Republic 
After the Aster Revolution led to the collapse of Austria-Hungary, the complex of buildings were abandoned. Since 1921, the Polish Cadet Corps No. 1 (Korpus Kadetów Nr.1 - from 1935, named after Józef Pilsudski) was re-located there from Kraków. The German invasion forced the Polish command in September 1939 to evacuate from Rawicz to Lviv the Cadet Corps No. 3. However, in connection with the offensive of the Red Army, it was not possible to start classes. After the accession of Western Ukrainian lands to the Ukrainian SSR, the Soviet authorities disbanded the educational institution.

Soviet Union 
From the end of September to November 14, 1939, the headquarters of the Ukrainian Front were stationed in the premises of the former Cadet Corps. After its disbandment, the Lviv Infantry School of the Red Army was stationed there, which was moved to Ostroh a year later. From December 1940 to March 1941, training buildings on the street. Kadetsky, 32 become the place of the disposition of the 15th motorized artillery brigade. In March 1941, it replaced the 32nd Panzer Division of the 4th Mechanized Corps of the Red Army. During the German occupation of the current Academy there was a military hospital, and from the end of July 1944 and until the spring of 1947, a Soviet military hospital.

Then there was a military-political school, created on November 18, 1939 in the city of Bryansk, the Orel region. The school trained police officers. During the years of the German-Soviet War, the school moved to the city of Bobrov, Khalturin, Kharkiv, and about 11 thousand officers graduated there during that time. For courage during the war, 15 students of the educational institution received the title of Hero of the Soviet Union. In 1947, the school moved to Lviv and became the Lviv Military-Political School (for some time, it was named after Nikolay Shchors), occupying the territory of the cadet corps barracks. The facility trained officers for service in the editorial boards of the military media and cultural and educational institutions of the Soviet Armed Forces. In 1962, Lviv military-political school was transformed into a higher one. On April 30, 1975, by the decree of the Presidium of the Supreme Soviet of the USSR, the Lviv higher military-political school was awarded the Order of the Red Star. In 1978, for services in increasing the combat readiness of the armed forces of the Czechoslovak Socialist Republic, the LVVPU was awarded the Order of the Red Star of the Czechoslovak Socialist Republic. During the years of Soviet rule, the school gained experience in training officer personnel for the armed forces of foreign powers. After gaining the status of a higher education institution at a special faculty in August 1971, servicemen from more than 20 countries of Eastern Europe, Asia, Africa and Latin America studied there and gained experience in political education and military culture.

Ukraine 

With Ukraine regaining its independence, the creation of its own Armed Forces begins a new page in the history of the Lviv Military Institute. According to the Resolution of the Cabinet of Ministers of Ukraine No. 490 dated August 19, 1992, on October 8, 1993, on the basis of Lviv Higher Military School and military departments of civil higher educational institutions of Lviv, a new type of military educational establishment was created which was the first in Ukraine to be closely integrated with The system of civilian higher education, in particular with the National University "Lviv Polytechnic". Thus, the implementation of the fundamental principle of the Concept of Military Education in Ukraine, established by the Decree of the Cabinet of Ministers of Ukraine of December 15, 1997 No. 1410 "On the Establishment of a Unified System of Military Education," which states that "military education is integrated into the state system of education on the basis of a unified Legislative and regulatory framework ".

In close integration with the basic university, the Lviv Military Institute began to train officers from fifteen specialties since 1993, including "Combat application of mechanized units", "Combat application of aeromobile (parachute-landing) units" (cadets of these specialties were transferred to Odessa Institute of Ground Forces in 1995), as well as on specialties "Financial support and economy of combat and economic activity of troops", "Jurisprudence", etc.

On November 18, 2000, for the great successes in training qualified specialists for the Ukrainian army and on the occasion of the 100th anniversary of the training of officers in Galicia, the President Leonid Kuchma granted the academy with the honorific title "Hetman Petro Sagaidachny" and was awarded the Diploma of Honor. By decree of the Cabinet of Ministers of Ukraine dated May 26, 2005, No. 381, the educational institution was reorganized into the Lviv Institute of Land Forces and from September 1, 2006, it trains military specialists in all specialties of the Land Forces of the Armed Forces of Ukraine. On September 30, 2006, the Institute was visited by President Viktor Yushchenko, who highly assessed the organization of training officers for the Armed Forces of Ukraine.

Since September 1, 2009, according to the Resolution of the Cabinet of Ministers dated May 13, 2009, it was transformed into the Ground Forces Academy "Hetman Petro Sahaidachnyi", mandated to form both officers and non-commissioned personnel of the Ground Forces. On September 21, 2015, President Petro Poroshenko ordered the academy be granted the status of a National Academy and removed its Order of the Red Star. As of 2 March 2018, two alumni of the academy were killed in the Anti-Terrorist Operation.

Academics

The Academy provides training for officers in the command and control of mechanized forces, airborne troops, special forces and military intelligence, ground artillery, missile forces, artillery reconnaissance, missile and artillery weapons, automobiles and automobile industry, physical education, cultural studies, journalism (last edition of 2010), and musical art.

The academy has four faculties:

 Faculty of Combat Use of Troops
 Faculty of Air Assault Forces
 Faculty of Missile Forces and Artillery
 Faculty of training specialists for the provision of troops

The academy also includes the Staff Sergeants Military College, which trains junior specialists in the repair and maintenance of automotive equipment, warehouse managers in various fields, as well as musicians in military bands. Cadets undergo military practice at the International Center for Peacekeeping and Security. In 2009 alone, the academy graduated 238 lieutenants.

Chervonohrad Military Lyceum 

The Chervonohrad Military Lyceum is a part of the academy. Lyceum students study from grades 10-11. It has a total number will be 400 people, with an annual enrollment of 200 lyceum students. The creation of a military lyceum in Chervonohrad was planned in 2017 on the basis of a former boarding school. It was created by order of Minister of Defense Stepan Poltorak on 3 August 2018. The school year began on 1 September 2019.

Student life 
The academy maintains its own Cadet Military Band which promotes the patriotic, cultural and musical education of Ground Forces. Created in 1942 during the Siege of Stalingrad, it is part of the Military Music Department of the General Staff of the Ukrainian Armed Forces. LVVPU was a football team based in Lviv that served as part of the Lviv Military-Political School. On campus, there is a restored church of the Archangel Michael that was constructed during the Austrian period. Cadets from the academy took part in the 2010 Moscow Victory Day Parade on Red Square, celebrating the 65th anniversary of the end of the Great Patriotic War. In recent years, it has received visits from distinguished visitors. Among them, was Tsakhiagiin Elbegdorj, an alumni who visited in 2011 as part of a state visit to Ukraine in his position as President of Mongolia.

Museum of History
The Museum of History of the National Academy is a military-historical museum located in the academy. The museum presents the history of the educational institution, as well as the history of educational institutions that previously existed on the territory of the town. The renovated museum was opened on 28 October 2010. The museum consists of 9 halls. The museum is headed by Mykhailo Slobodyanyuk.

Notable graduates
Tsakhiagiin Elbegdorj, former President of Mongolia
Dmytro Tymchuk, one of the coordinators of the Information Resistance blog
Iryna Vereshchuk, former Deputy of the Verkhovna Rada (Ukraine's national parliament) and Minister of Reintegration of Temporarily Occupied Territories

See also

 Combined Arms Academy of the Armed Forces of the Russian Federation
 Military Academy of Belarus
 Military Institute of the Kazakh Ground Forces
 FC Sokil Lviv

References

External links 
 academia.in.ua

Military academies of Ukraine
Educational institutions established in 1899
Universities and colleges in Lviv
1899 establishments in Austria-Hungary